Kathleen Mary Linn Stock  is a British philosopher and writer. She was a professor of philosophy at the University of Sussex until 2021. She has published academic work on aesthetics, fiction, imagination, sexual objectification, and sexual orientation.

Her views on transgender rights and gender identity have become a contentious issue. In December 2020, she was appointed Officer of the Order of the British Empire (OBE) in recognition of services to higher education, a decision which was subsequently criticised by a group of over 600 academic philosophers who argued that Stock's "harmful rhetoric" contributed to the marginalisation of transgender people. In October 2021, she resigned from the University of Sussex. This came after a student campaign took place calling for her dismissal and the faculty trade union accused the university of "institutional transphobia." A group of over 200 academic philosophers from the UK signed an open letter in support of Stock's academic freedom.

Early life
Stock was born in Aberdeen and raised in Montrose Scotland; the daughter of English academics at Aberdeen University, a philosophy lecturer and a newspaper proofreader. She was an undergraduate reading French and philosophy at Exeter College, Oxford, followed by an MA at St Andrews. Stock then won a scholarship for a philosophy PhD at Leeds.

Academic career
Following her graduation, Stock briefly taught at the University of Lancaster and the University of East Anglia before joining the University of Sussex in 2003, where she worked as a reader and later a professor of philosophy. On 28 October 2021, the university announced Stock's resignation from the position following controversy around her views on gender identity; the announcement, written by the school's vice-chancellor, expressed regret that Stock did not "feel able to return to work" and that she had been subject to "bullying and harassment".

Stock has written one monograph as well as articles in peer-reviewed academic journals, and has contributed several chapters to edited volumes. She edited Philosophers on Music: Experience, Meaning, and Work (first edition 2007), and together with Katherine Thomson-Jones, she edited New Waves in Aesthetics (2008).  In her monograph Only Imagine: Fiction, Interpretation and Imagination (2017), she argues for authorial intentionalism.

Stock was the vice-president of the British Society of Aesthetics from 2019 to 2020. She has given lectures at the University of York, the Aristotelian Society, the London Aesthetics Forum, the University of Wolverhampton, and the American Society for Aesthetics. On 28 October 2021 Stock resigned from the University of Sussex. Following Stock's resignation, she announced she would be joining the University of Austin as a fellow on a part-time basis without the requirement to move to Austin.

Views on gender self-identification
Stock is acknowledged as a prominent "gender-critical" feminist. She has opposed transgender self-identification in regards to proposed reforms to the 2004 UK Gender Recognition Act. She has said that many trans women are "still males with male genitalia, many are sexually attracted to females, and they should not be in places where females undress or sleep in a completely unrestricted way." She has denied opposing trans rights, saying, "I gladly and vocally assert the rights of trans people to live their lives free from fear, violence, harassment or any discrimination" and "I think that discussing female rights is compatible with defending these trans rights".

Students and academics began to criticise Stock's views in 2018, when she spoke against proposed changes to the Gender Recognition Act; the changes would have allowed people of all ages to legally self-identify as a particular gender without the requirement of a psychological or medicalised diagnosis. She received death threats as a result of her position.

In 2019, Stock signed the "Declaration on Women's Sex-Based Rights" from the Women's Human Rights Campaign (WHRC). In June 2019, Stock was invited to speak at the Aristotelian Society about her views on gender identity. The organization Minorities and Philosophy (MAP) UK and their international counterpart released a joint statement against Stock speaking at the event, saying "Not every item of personal and ideological obsession is worthy of philosophical debate. In particular, scepticism about the rights of marginalised groups and individuals, where issues of life and death are at stake, are not up for debate."

In 2020, Stock testified before the Women and Equalities Committee of the House of Commons, and gave oral evidence in response to the reform of the Gender Recognition Act.

Journalist Janice Turner wrote in The Times that Stock "teaches trans students, respecting their pronouns, and has written repeatedly in support of their human rights".

In 2021, Stock made a submission to the proposed Higher Education (Freedom of Speech) Bill, highlighting what she described as harassment and a culture of fear and self-censorship in British universities in relation to her gender critical views concerning "transactivist demands to recognise and prioritise gender identity".

Her 2021 book, Material Girls: Why Reality Matters for Feminism offers a critical discussion of gender identity theory. Her thesis, according to reviewer Christina Patterson, is that there is "a new orthodoxy, one in which sex gives way to feeling, and feeling trumps facts". In the book, Stock supports protective laws for trans people, but opposes, according to The Guardian, "the institutionalisation of the idea that gender identity is all that matters – that how you identify automatically confers all the entitlements of that sex". She describes the law that gives trans people the right to change gender as a legal fiction, a kind of "useful untruth".

In May 2021, Stock was appointed as a trustee of the LGB Alliance.

In January 2023, Stock criticized the UK government's proposed ban on conversion therapy, saying that "Banning conversion therapy for minors will rob trans children of the chance to think again, putting them on a pathway to medical treatment".

Campaign by students at Sussex University
In October 2021, a group describing themselves as queer, trans, and non-binary University of Sussex students began a campaign for Stock to be fired, stating that she was "espousing a bastardised version of radical feminism that excludes and endangers trans people". Students criticised Stock for being a trustee for LGB Alliance and for signing the declaration of the Women's Human Rights Campaign. The group, Anti Terf Sussex, said Stock was a danger to transgender people and that "We're not up for debate. We cannot be reasoned out of existence". A statement on Instagram said it was from "an anonymous, unaffiliated group of queer, trans and non-binary students who will not allow our community to be slandered and harmed by someone who's [sic] salary comes from our pockets". Police advised Stock to take precautions for her safety, including installing CCTV at her home and using bodyguards on campus.

Stock herself said: "Universities aren't places where students should just expect to hear their own thoughts reflected back at them. Arguments should be met by arguments and evidence by evidence, not intimidation or aggression". She said that months previously, she had complained to the University of Sussex, alleging it had failed to protect her and to safeguard her academic freedom.

Supporters of Stock's position 
Junior Minister for Women and Equalities Kemi Badenoch, barrister Allison Bailey, and writer Julie Bindel spoke in Stock's defence and University of Sussex vice-chancellor Adam Tickell condemned the campaign as a threat to academic freedom. Announcing an investigation into the protests, the vice-chancellor stated "I'm really concerned that we have masked protesters putting up posters calling for the sacking of somebody for exercising her right to articulate her views", and that the institution had "legal and moral duties to ensure people can speak freely".

A group of over 200 academic philosophers from the UK signed an open letter in support of Stock's academic freedom, and her ability to engage "in open and scholarly debate without fear of harassment." Another open letter in support of Stock's academic freedom was signed by legal academics.

The Times reported that the head of the Equality and Human Rights Commission, Baroness Falkner of Margravine, "called the attacks on Professor Kathleen Stock disgraceful and said that tougher regulation was needed to protect people from abuse." She said: "The rights of trans people must of course be protected, but the attempt to silence academic freedom of expression is the opposite of what university life is about". Minister for women and equalities Liz Truss gave Falkner's letter her "full support". Oxford historian Selina Todd described Tickell's statement as paying "lip service to academic freedom while assuring students of the university's 'inclusivity'" and criticised the University and College Union for their silence.  The Times published a letter in support of Stock from a group of trans people, saying that they were "appalled that trans rights ... are being used to excuse an unprincipled campaign of harassment and abuse."

A statement of solidarity signed by hundreds of "academics, retired academics, students, alumni and university/college employees" circulated by the GC Academia Network, a group that describes itself as gender-critical, expressed concerns "about the ongoing erosion of women's sex-based rights in law, policy and practice" and condemns the recent escalation of intimidation by a small group.

Opponents of Stock's position 
The Sussex branch of the University and College Union (UCU) strongly criticized the vice-chancellor over his statement, saying that Tickell had not upheld the dignity and respect of trans students and staff. The union said that it stands in solidarity with the students and their right to protest, and that "we urge our management to take a clear and strong stance against transphobia at Sussex." It also called for an investigation into "institutional transphobia" at the University of Sussex. However, it added "we do not endorse the call for any worker to be summarily sacked." Responding to the statement, Stock said that it had "effectively ended" her career at Sussex University.

The Shadow Minister for Women and Equalities, Taiwo Owatemi, called UCU's statement "strong and principled" and said she was "greatly concerned by [Stock's] work as a trustee for the LGB Alliance group" which she said should be "rejected by all those who believe in equality."

Shortly after releasing the statement, members of the UCU Sussex branch executive said they had received personal threats, and had their contact details released. A spokesperson on behalf of the UCU's national organisation condemned this and said "these matters are being raised immediately with leadership at the university."

Resignation 
After announcing her resignation from the university on 28 October 2021, Stock gave a radio interview on Woman's Hour on 3 November. She denied that she is transphobic and explained that her resignation followed attacks on her by colleagues who are opposed to her views and who foster an "extreme" response from their students: "instead of getting involved in arguing with me using reason, evidence – the traditional university methods – they tell their students in lectures that I pose a harm to trans students."

The Lesbian Project 
On 9 March 2023, Stock, alongside tennis player Martina Navratilova and writer Julie Bindel, launched The Lesbian Project. The group intends to give a non-partisan political voice to UK women who are same-sex attracted. It describes its purpose to "highlight and champion the experiences, insights and sensibilities of lesbians in all their diversity". Explaining her motivation, Stock said: "Lesbians will always exist but we’re in a crisis in which young lesbians don't want to be associated with the word. Some of them want to describe themselves as queer and some of them prefer not to see themselves as women but as non-binary." The purpose of the Lesbian Project, according to Stock, is "to put lesbian needs and interests back into focus, to stop lesbians disappearing into the rainbow soup and to give them a non-partisan political voice." PinkNews said the Lesbian Project is a "group created exclusively for cisgender lesbians – in reaction to trans inclusion in LGBTQ+ spaces", and reported that the launch materials unintentionally used pictures of trans and non-binary people.

Honours 
Stock was appointed Officer of the Order of the British Empire (OBE) in the 2021 New Year Honours for services to higher education. In response, over 600 academics signed a letter criticising the government's decision and expressing concern about a "tendency to mistake transphobic fear mongering for valuable scholarship, and attacks on already marginalised people for courageous exercises of free speech". Stock responded that the content of the letter was ridiculous, saying "they accused me of completely wild things like supporting patriarchy and preventing transgender people from accessing medical care, even though I have not said anything about it except when it comes to children".  A counter letter defending her was signed by more than 400.

Personal life
Stock is lesbian, having come out later in life; in Material Girls, she describes herself as "a lesbian and... a sex-nonconforming woman". Janice Turner in The Times described her, amongst other terms, as a "left-wing lesbian". She lives in Sussex with her partner and two sons from a previous marriage. Her height is over 6 feet.

Selected works

 Philosophers on Music: Experience, Meaning, and Work (Oxford University Press, 2007), ed.
 New Waves in Aesthetics, edited with Katherine Thomson-Jones (Palgrave-Macmillan, 2008).
 Fantasy, imagination, and film. British Journal of Aesthetics, 2009. 49 (4): 357–369.
 Fictive Utterance and Imagining. Aristotelian Society Supplementary Volume. 2011, 85 (1): 145–161.
 Some Reflections on Seeing-as, Metaphor-Grasping and Imagining. Aisthesis: Pratiche, Linguaggi E Saperi Dell'Estetico. 2013, 6 (1): 201–213.
 Imagining and Fiction: Some Issues. Philosophy Compass. 2013, 8 (10): 887–896.
 Sexual Objectification. Analysis, 2015, 75 (2): 191–195.
 Learning from fiction and theories of fictional content. Teorema: International Journal of Philosophy, 2016, (3): 69–83.
Only Imagine: Fiction, Interpretation and Imagination (Oxford University Press, 2017).
 Material Girls: Why Reality Matters for Feminism (Fleet, 2021).

References

External links
 
 University of Sussex bio
 

Living people
Philosophers of literature
Philosophers of music
British women philosophers
21st-century British philosophers
Academics of the University of Sussex
Officers of the Order of the British Empire
Alumni of the University of Leeds
Alumni of the University of St Andrews
Academics of Lancaster University
Academics of the University of East Anglia
British feminists
Lesbian feminists
British LGBT writers
Feminism and transgender
LGBT philosophers
Year of birth missing (living people)
People from Montrose, Angus